Scissor Manohar is an Indian comedian and actor.

Career 
Manohar began to work as a production assistant working on films such as Puthiya Vaarpugal (1979).  Manohar earned the name Scissor for his character in Gokulathil Seethai (1996). In the film, he introduces himself as 'Scissor Manohar' when Suvalakshmi and Karan are talking. He has since became a comedian and has acted in over 240 Tamil language films. He played notable roles in the films Vindhai (2015) and Kadikara Manithargal (2018).

Partial filmography
All films are in Tamil, unless otherwise noted.

References

External links
 
 Scissor Manohar on Moviebuff

Living people
Tamil male actors
Tamil comedians
Indian male film actors
Male actors from Tamil Nadu
Male actors in Tamil cinema
21st-century Tamil male actors
Indian male comedians
Year of birth missing (living people)